The Allegheny County Department of Public Works is a public works department that oversees infrastructure, maintenance and engineering services in Allegheny County, Pennsylvania.

The current director is Stephen G. Shanley, and the department is headquartered in Room 501 of Pittsburgh's County Office Building on 542 Forbes Avenue.

External links
Allegheny County Department of Public Works

County government agencies in Pennsylvania
Government of Allegheny County, Pennsylvania
Public works ministries